The Pulitzer Prize for Feature Photography is one of the American Pulitzer Prizes annually awarded for journalism. It recognizes a distinguished example of feature photography in black and white or color, which may consist of a photograph or photographs, a sequence or an album.

The Feature Photography prize was inaugurated in 1968 when the single Pulitzer Prize for Photography was replaced by the Feature prize and "Pulitzer Prize for Spot News Photography", renamed for "Pulitzer Prize for Breaking News Photography" in 2000.

Winners and citations
One Feature Photography Pulitzer has been awarded annually from 1968 without exception.
 1968: Toshio Sakai, United Press International, "for his Vietnam War combat photograph, 'Dreams of Better Times'."
 1969: Moneta Sleet Jr. of Ebony, "for his photograph of Martin Luther King Jr.'s widow and child, taken at Dr. King's funeral."
 1970: Dallas Kinney, Palm Beach Post (Florida), "for his portfolio of pictures of Florida migrant workers, 'Migration to Misery'."
 1971: Jack Dykinga, Chicago Sun-Times, "for his dramatic and sensitive photographs at the Lincoln and Dixon State Schools for the Retarded in Illinois."
 1972: David Hume Kennerly, United Press International, "for his dramatic photographs of the Vietnam War in 1971."
 1973: Brian Lanker, Topeka Capital-Journal, "for his sequence on child birth, as exemplified by his photograph, 'Moment of Life'."
 1974: Slava Veder, Associated Press, "for his picture Burst of Joy, which illustrated the return of an American prisoner of war from captivity in North Vietnam."
 1975: Matthew Lewis, Washington Post, "for his photographs in color and black and white."
 1976: Photographic staff of the Louisville Courier-Journal and Times, "for a comprehensive pictorial report on busing in Louisville's schools."
 1977: Robin Hood, Chattanooga News-Free Press, "for his photograph of a disabled veteran and his child at an Armed Forces Day parade."
 1978: J. Ross Baughman, Associated Press, "for three photographs from guerrilla areas in Rhodesia."
 1979: Staff photographers of the Boston Herald American, "for photographic coverage of the blizzard of 1978."
 1980: Erwin H. Hagler, Dallas Times Herald, "for a series on the Western cowboy."
 1981: Taro Yamasaki, Detroit Free Press, "for his photographs of Jackson State Prison, Michigan."
 1982: John H. White, Chicago Sun-Times, "for consistently excellent work on a variety of subjects."
 1983: James B. Dickman, Dallas Times Herald, "for his telling photographs of life and death in El Salvador."
 1984: Anthony Suau, The Denver Post, "for a series of photographs which depict the tragic effects of starvation in Ethiopia and for a single photograph of a woman at her husband's gravesite on Memorial Day."
 1985: Stan Grossfeld, Boston Globe, "for his series of photographs of the famine in Ethiopia and for his pictures of illegal aliens on the U.S.-Mexico border."
 1986: Tom Gralish, The Philadelphia Inquirer, "for his series of photographs of Philadelphia's homeless."
 1987: David C. Peterson, Des Moines Register, "for his photographs depicting the shattered dreams of American farmers."
 1988: Michel du Cille, Miami Herald, "for photographs portraying the decay and subsequent rehabilitation of a housing project overrun by the drug crack."
 1989: Manny Crisostomo, Detroit Free Press, "for his series of photographs depicting student life at Southwestern High School in Detroit."
 1990: David C. Turnley, Detroit Free Press, "for photographs of the political uprisings in China and Eastern Europe."
 1991: William Snyder, The Dallas Morning News, "for his photographs of ill and orphaned children living in subhuman conditions in Romania."
 1992: John Kaplan, Block Newspapers, Toledo, Ohio, "for his photographs depicting the diverse lifestyles of seven 21-year-olds across the United States."
 1993: Staff of Associated Press, "for its portfolio of images drawn from the 1992 presidential campaign."
 1994: Kevin Carter, a free-lance photographer, "for a picture first published in The New York Times of a starving Sudanese girl who collapsed on her way to a feeding center while a vulture waited nearby."
 1995: Staff of Associated Press, "for its portfolio of photographs chronicling the horror and devastation in Rwanda."
 1996: Stephanie Welsh, "a free-lancer, for her shocking sequence of photos, published by Newhouse News Service, of a female genital cutting rite in Kenya."
 1997: Alexander Zemlianichenko, Associated Press, "for his photograph of Russian President Boris Yeltsin dancing at a rock concert during his campaign for re-election. This was originally nominated in the Spot News Photography section, but was moved by the board to Feature Photography."
 1998: Clarence Williams, Los Angeles Times, "for his powerful images documenting the plight of young children with parents addicted to alcohol and drugs."
 1999: Staff of Associated Press, "for its striking collection of photographs of the key players and events stemming from President Clinton's affair with Monica Lewinsky and the ensuing impeachment hearings."
 2000: Carol Guzy, Michael Williamson and Lucian Perkins, Washington Post, "for their intimate and poignant images depicting the plight of the Kosovo refugees."
 2001: Matt Rainey, Star-Ledger (New Jersey), "for his emotional photographs that illustrate the care and recovery of two students critically burned in a dormitory fire at Seton Hall University."
 2002: The New York Times staff, "for its photographs chronicling the pain and the perseverance of people enduring protracted conflict in Afghanistan and Pakistan."
 2003: Don Bartletti, Los Angeles Times, "for his memorable portrayal of how undocumented Central American youths, often facing deadly danger, travel north to the United States."
 2004: Carolyn Cole, Los Angeles Times, "for her cohesive, behind-the-scenes look at the effects of civil war in Liberia, with special attention to innocent citizens caught in the conflict."
 2005: Deanne Fitzmaurice, San Francisco Chronicle, "for her sensitive photo essay on an Oakland hospital's effort to mend an Iraqi boy nearly killed by an explosion."
 2006: Todd Heisler of Rocky Mountain News, "for his haunting, behind-the-scenes look at funerals for Colorado Marines who return from Iraq in caskets."
 2007: Renée C. Byer of The Sacramento Bee, "for her intimate portrayal of a single mother and her young son as he loses his battle with cancer."
 2008: Preston Gannaway of the Concord Monitor, "for her intimate chronicle of a family coping with a parent's terminal illness."
 2009: Damon Winter of The New York Times, "for his memorable array of pictures deftly capturing multiple facets of Barack Obama's presidential campaign."
 2010: Craig F. Walker of The Denver Post, "for his intimate portrait of a teenager who joins the Army at the height of insurgent violence in Iraq, poignantly searching for meaning and manhood."
 2011: Barbara Davidson of Los Angeles Times, "For her intimate story of innocent victims trapped in the city's crossfire of deadly gang violence."
 2012: Craig F. Walker of The Denver Post "for his compassionate chronicle of an honorably discharged veteran, home from Iraq and struggling with a severe case of post-traumatic stress, images that enable viewers to better grasp a national issue".
 2013: Javier Manzano "for his extraordinary picture, distributed by Agence France-Presse, of two Syrian rebel soldiers tensely guarding their position as beams of light stream through bullet holes in a nearby metal wall".
 2014: Josh Haner of The New York Times, "for his stirring portraits of the painful rehabilitation of a man badly injured in the Boston Marathon bombings".
 2015: Daniel Berehulak, freelance photographer, The New York Times "for his gripping, courageous photographs of the Ebola epidemic in West Africa."
 2016: Jessica Rinaldi of The Boston Globe "for the raw and revealing photographic story of a boy who strives to find his footing after abuse by those he trusted."
 2017:  E. Jason Wambsgans of Chicago Tribune "for a superb portrayal of a 10-year-old boy and his mother striving to put the boy's life back together after he survived a shooting in Chicago."
 2018: Staff of Reuters "for shocking photographs that exposed the world to the violence Rohingya refugees faced in fleeing Myanmar."
 2019:  Lorenzo Tugnoli of The Washington Post "for brilliant photo storytelling of the tragic famine in Yemen, shown through images in which beauty and composure are intertwined with devastation. (Moved by the jury from Breaking News Photography, where it was originally entered.)"
 2020: Associated Press photographers Dar Yasin, Mukhtar Khan and Channi Anand "for striking images captured during a communications blackout in Kashmir depicting life in the contested territory as India stripped it of its semi-autonomy."
2021: Emilio Morenatti of the Associated Press, "For a poignant series of photographs that takes viewers into the lives of the elderly in Spain struggling during the COVID-19 pandemic."
2022: Adnan Abidi, Sanna Irshad Mattoo, Amit Dave and Danish Siddiqui (posthumous) of Reuters, "For images of COVID’s toll in India that balanced intimacy and devastation, while offering viewers a heightened sense of place."

References

External links

Traveling exhibit of Pulitzer Prize winning photographs

Photojournalism awards
Pulitzer Prize for Feature Photography winners
Pulitzer Prizes by category